"Start the Commotion" is a song by British electronic music duo The Wiseguys, from their second album The Antidote. It was released as a single in the UK in 1998, and peaked at #66 on the UK Singles Chart. A re-release the following year gave the song a higher chart placing, peaking at #47. It also peaked at #36 on the American dance charts in 2000.  "Start the Commotion" has also been officially remixed by Eric Kupper and DJ Spinna.

Background
The song is built around a repeated sample from the 1966 song "Wild Child" by The Ventures.

Track listing
UK CD single
 "Start the Commotion" (Radio edit)
 "Fatal Femme" (feat. Sense Live)
 "Start the Commotion" (Full length)

2001 re-release
After being used in a Mitsubishi Motors television commercial in the U.S. in 2001, the song gained a second life and significant radio airplay, reaching the top 40 on the Billboard Hot 100 and making it the Wiseguys' best known song.

Charts

Other uses in popular culture
It was featured in the 2001 comedy Zoolander, where it was used to promote the film. 
It was also featured in the films Gun Shy and Kangaroo Jack.

References

1998 singles
The Wiseguys songs
1999 singles
2001 singles
1998 songs
Music videos directed by Pedro Romhanyi